Bengkulu Tengah Harapan Bangsa FC (commonly known as Benteng HB) is an Indonesian football team based in Central Bengkulu Regency, Bengkulu. They currently competes in Liga 3.

Honours
 Liga 3 Bengkulu
 Champion: 2021

References

External links
 

Football clubs in Bengkulu
Football clubs in Indonesia
Association football clubs established in 2021
2021 establishments in Indonesia